Lori R. Saldaña (born November 7, 1958) is an American politician from San Diego, California. She is a former member of the California State Assembly from the 76th Assembly district (central San Diego). She served from 2004 to 2010, when term limits prevented her from seeking re-election. She served as a Democrat.

After leaving the Assembly, Saldaña campaigned unsuccessfully for a number of other elected positions. This included the 2012 election for California's 52nd congressional district, the 2016 San Diego mayoral election, the 2018 San Diego County Board of Supervisors election, and the 2022 San Diego City Council District 2.

Early life, education, and academic career

Lori Saldaña was born in 1958 in San Diego, the third of four daughters born to Virginia and Frank Saldaña. Frank Saldaña served in the Marine Corps and was a reporter for the San Diego Evening Tribune. Saldaña grew up in the Clairemont area of San Diego. After graduation from Madison High School, she attended San Diego State University (SDSU), earning both a Bachelor of Arts degree and a master's degree in Education.

Saldaña started her post-graduate life as a coach at San Diego City College, Clairemont High School, and Madison High School. Later, she worked as a professor and administrator in the San Diego Community College District, where she taught Business Information Technology and managed Department of Labor grants used to provide technical skills and training to the student base. She has also taught at her alma mater, San Diego State University.

She is the author of Lori Saldaña's Backpacking Primer (1995).

California Assembly

Elections
In 2004, incumbent State Assemblywoman Christine Kehoe of California's 76th State Assembly district decided to retire in order to run for a seat in the California Senate. Saldaña ran for the open seat and won the Democratic primary with a plurality of 41% of the vote. In the general election, she defeated Republican Tricia Hunter, a former Assemblywoman, 54%-41%. In 2006, she won re-election to a second term with 64% of the vote. In 2008, she won re-election to a third term with 64% of the vote. She left the Assembly due to term limits in 2010.

Tenure
In 2007 Saldaña was named Legislator of the Year by Californians Against Waste for her legislation regarding E-waste.

In the 2009 session of the state legislature, Saldana introduced three bills that would restrict California's ballot initiative process:

 Assembly Bill 6, which would require petition drive management companies to pay an annual fee and register with the California Secretary of State
 Assembly Bill 426, which would increase the fee that proponents of an initiative measure are required to pay at the time of submitting the draft of the measure to the Attorney General from $200 to $2,000.
 Assembly Bill 1068, which would forbid contracts with signature gatherers premised upon whether or not the measure qualifies for the ballot.

Due to California's term limits, Saldaña's assembly career ended on August 31, 2010 in an acrimonious late-night session as she pushed legislation banning the open carry of firearms known as AB 1934. Saldaña presented her bill to the Assembly with 70 minutes remaining in the 2010 regular session, and would not suspend debate when it became clear that its opponents would not let it come to an early vote. Saldaña later clashed with fellow Democrats over their refusal to employ parliamentary procedure tactics to end debate so her measure could be heard.

Committee assignments
She was appointed Assistant Majority Whip and served on the Appropriations, Natural Resources, Veteran's Affairs, and Water, Parks and Wildlife committees.

2012 congressional election

Originally, she was planning on running for a seat in the California Senate, but instead decided to run in the newly redrawn California's 52nd congressional district. She came in third place in the open primary and did not advance to the general election, which was ultimately won by Scott Peters.

2016 San Diego mayoral election

In January 2016, she announced her candidacy for the mayor of San Diego against incumbent mayor Kevin Faulconer in his bid for re-election. For this election, she ran with a party affiliation of "no preference," though the office of mayor is officially nonpartisan. She lost in the primary to Faulconer, coming in second.

2018 San Diego County board of supervisors election
In 2018, Saldaña ran for a seat on the officially nonpartisan San Diego County Board of Supervisors. She campaigned as a Democrat, having changed her party affiliation back after the mayoral election. She came in third place in the open primary and did not advance to the general election, which was ultimately won by Nathan Fletcher.

References

External links 
Join California Lori Saldana

Living people
Democratic Party members of the California State Assembly
Politicians from San Diego
San Diego State University alumni
Hispanic and Latino American state legislators in California
Hispanic and Latino American women in politics
1958 births
Women state legislators in California
21st-century American politicians
21st-century American women politicians